Isaac Jackson Holstein V (born September 7, 1987) is a Filipino-American former professional basketball player. He last played for the Barako Bull Energy of  the Philippine Basketball Association. He was drafted with the 7th overall pick by the GlobalPort Batang Pier in the 2013 PBA draft. Two days after the draft, he was traded to San Mig in exchange for fellow rookie Justin Chua and veteran Leo Najorda.

Holstein is a 6-foot 9 stretchman who is good at putbacks and on mid-range shooting. Holstein is a three-time Philippine Basketball Association and member of the 2013 San Mig Super Coffee Mixers roster who captured the very rare Grand Slam.

His entry into the PBA signals the complete reversal of his basketball fortunes. A former NCAA Division II player, he quit basketball and decided to embark on a different path in life. Instead, he saw his hoops career resurrected after moving to Manila to play in the PBA D-League, first with Big Chill before moving to Blackwater.

After spending his rookie season with the grand slam champion Purefoods Star Hotshots, he was traded along with Ronnie Matias midway through the 2014–15 PBA Philippine Cup for Barako Bull Energy veteran center Mick Pennisi. After a couple of months, he was waived by the Energy.

References

1987 births
Living people
Basketball players from West Virginia
Filipino men's basketball players
West Virginia State Yellow Jackets men's basketball players
Centers (basketball)
Magnolia Hotshots players
Barako Bull Energy players
American sportspeople of Filipino descent
American men's basketball players
NorthPort Batang Pier draft picks
Citizens of the Philippines through descent